John Mountsteven Bristow (30 September 1886 – 22 November 1954) was a former Australian rules footballer who played with Carlton, Melbourne and Richmond in the Victorian Football League (VFL).

Notes

External links 

		
Jack Bristow's profile at Blueseum

1886 births
Australian rules footballers from Victoria (Australia)
Carlton Football Club players
Melbourne Football Club players
Richmond Football Club players
Australian military personnel of World War I
1954 deaths